Cosima is a feminine given name.

Cosima may also refer to:

Cosima (album), a 2004 album by Australian singer Cosima De Vito
Cosima (novel), a posthumous novel by Italian writer Grazia Deledda
644 Cosima, an asteroid
COSIMA (Cometary Secondary Ion Mass Analyser), a science experiment on board the Rosetta spacecraft

See also
 
 Cosimo (disambiguation)